Damme Priory (Priorat St. Benedikt, Damme) is a Benedictine priory dependent on Münsterschwarzach Abbey, and is situated at Kemphausen in Damme in the district of Vechta in Lower Saxony, Germany.

In December 1962 monks from Münsterschwarzach settled in Kemphausen at the farm of the Kophanke family, the last member of whom (Fräulein Maria Kophanke) wished the property to be used for monastic purposes. From 1970 to 1983 the community had a small boarding-school and now run a guest-house.

The priory belongs to the Ottilien Congregation of the Benedictine Confederation.

Labyrinth
In the nearby woods is a small dry-stone labyrinth, built in 2004.

Sources and external links

 Labyrinthe in Deutschland: Damme Priory labyrinth 

Vechta (district)
Benedictine monasteries in Germany
Monasteries in Lower Saxony
European Monasteries of the Congregation of Missionary Benedictines of Saint Ottilien